The 2017 Payback was the fifth annual Payback professional wrestling pay-per-view and livestreaming event produced by WWE. It was held primarily for wrestlers from the promotion's Raw brand division. The event took place on April 30, 2017, at the SAP Center in San Jose, California. Due to that year's Superstar Shake-up (draft) that occurred just two weeks before Payback, the event included two interbrand matches with wrestlers from SmackDown as the matches had been scheduled before the Shake-up occurred. It was the final Payback event until 2020, as following WrestleMania 34 in 2018, WWE discontinued brand-exclusive PPVs, which resulted in the reduction of yearly PPVs produced. The theme of the event was wrestlers seeking payback against their opponents.

Eight matches were contested at the event, including one match on the Kickoff pre-show. In the main event, Braun Strowman defeated Roman Reigns. On the undercard, Raw's Bray Wyatt defeated SmackDown's Randy Orton in a House of Horrors match, which was a cinematic match, and Seth Rollins defeated Samoa Joe to end his undefeated streak since joining the main roster. The event also saw two titles change hands: Raw's Chris Jericho defeated SmackDown's Kevin Owens to win back the United States Championship, thus transferring Jericho to the SmackDown brand, and Alexa Bliss defeated Bayley to win the Raw Women's Championship, becoming the first woman to hold both the Raw Women's Championship and SmackDown Women's Championship.

Production

Background
Payback was an annual pay-per-view (PPV) and WWE Network event that was established by WWE in 2013. The concept of the event was the wrestlers seeking payback against their opponents. The 2017 event was the fifth event in the Payback chronology and was held on April 30, 2017, at the SAP Center in San Jose, California. It was the first Payback to be held following the reintroduction of the brand extension in July 2016, where the promotion again split its roster between the Raw and SmackDown brands, where wrestlers were exclusively assigned to perform. The 2017 event was subsequently scheduled as a Raw-exclusive pay-per-view.

Storylines
The card featured eight matches, including one on the Kickoff pre-show, that resulted from scripted storylines, where wrestlers portrayed heroes, villains, or less distinguishable characters in scripted events that built tension and culminated in a wrestling match or series of matches, with results predetermined by WWE's writers on the Raw brand. Storylines were produced on WWE's weekly television shows Monday Night Raw and 205 Live, the latter of which was cruiserweight-exclusive. As a result of the Superstar Shake-up (draft) that occurred two weeks before the event, Payback also included two interbrand matches that involved wrestlers from the SmackDown brand; part of their storylines were also produced on SmackDown Live.

At WrestleMania 33, Kevin Owens defeated Chris Jericho to win his first United States Championship. The following night on Raw, Jericho was granted a rematch for the championship at Payback. Jericho and Seth Rollins were then scheduled to face Owens and Samoa Joe on Raw, however, Owens and Joe attacked Jericho backstage, taking him out of the match. Jericho was then replaced by the returning Finn Bálor, who had been out since SummerSlam last year, and Rollins and Bálor defeated Owens and Joe. The following week, Owens faced and lost to Intercontinental Champion Dean Ambrose, who moved to the Raw brand as a result of the Superstar Shake-up. Following the match, Jericho appeared and performed a Codebreaker to Owens. The next night on SmackDown, Owens was moved to the SmackDown brand. SmackDown General Manager Daniel Bryan then announced that Jericho would transfer to SmackDown as well if he defeated Owens for the title at Payback. The two traded barbs from their respective shows over the next couple of weeks.

On the WrestleMania 33 Kickoff pre-show, Neville defeated Austin Aries to retain the WWE Cruiserweight Championship. On the April 4 episode of 205 Live, Aries won a fatal four-way number one contender's match to earn another match against Neville at Payback. On the April 10 episode of Raw, Neville was interrupted backstage by T. J. Perkins, who claimed that he could defeat Neville for the title. Neville then told Perkins that he was being overlooked and others, like Aries, were being given opportunities. He also told Perkins that he had respect for him. Aries then appeared and said that Neville was lying, but Perkins walked away without saying anything. Later, Perkins defeated Aries and following the match, Perkins aligned with Neville, turning heel. On the April 18 episode of 205 Live, after Aries defeated Perkins, Perkins and Neville both attacked Aries. On the following Raw, Aries and Gentleman Jack Gallagher and defeated Neville and Perkins.

At WrestleMania 33, Randy Orton defeated Bray Wyatt to win his ninth WWE Championship. On the following episode of SmackDown, Wyatt challenged Orton to a "House of Horrors" match and Orton accepted. Wyatt and the returning Erick Rowan then lost a tag team match against Orton and Luke Harper. On the April 10 episode of Raw, Wyatt was moved to the Raw brand as a result of the Superstar Shake-up, however, he was still allowed his non-title rematch with Orton, which was confirmed to happen at Payback. The next night on SmackDown, Orton faced Rowan. During the match, Wyatt appeared on the TitanTron, after which, Rowan attacked Orton with the steel steps and was disqualified. Wyatt similarly delivered promos about the House of Horrors match over the next couple of weeks on both Raw and SmackDown. Despite the match being originally scheduled for Orton's WWE Championship, it was later changed to a non-title match.

At WrestleMania 33, The Hardy Boyz (Jeff and Matt Hardy) made their return to WWE and were inserted into the Raw Tag Team Championship fatal four-way ladder match, where they won the championship. The following night on Raw, former champions Luke Gallows and Karl Anderson invoked their rematch clause, however, they lost the match. Later that night, Cesaro and Sheamus  defeated Enzo Amore and Big Cass, both teams who were also part of the title match at WrestleMania, to become the number one contenders for the tag titles. The following week, the championship match was confirmed for Payback. Also on that episode of Raw, The Hardys teamed up with Cesaro and Sheamus where they defeated Gallows and Anderson and The Shining Stars (Primo and Epico). On the April 17 episode of Raw, Jeff defeated Cesaro, and the two teams shook each other's hands out of respect. The following week, Matt defeated Sheamus after Sheamus was distracted by Jeff, who Sheamus had shoved outside of the ring. After the match, The Hardys reluctantly shook hands with Cesaro and Sheamus.

On the January 30 episode of Raw, Samoa Joe debuted on the roster debut by attacking Seth Rollins on Triple H's behalf. Joe's attacked Rollins re-injured knee, the same knee that had sidelined Rollins from November 2015 to May 2016, which almost prevented Rollins from competing at WrestleMania 33. However, Rollins managed to recover enough to defeat Triple H in a non-sanctioned match at WrestleMania. On the post-WrestleMania Raw, Rollins teamed up with the returning Finn Bálor and defeated Joe and Kevin Owens. The following week during the Superstar Shake-up, unsure of his fate, Rollins spoke about what he still wanted to do on Raw, which included settling his score with Joe. New Raw General Manager Kurt Angle declared that Rollins would be staying on Raw, after which, Joe came out and attacked Rollins. A match between the two was scheduled for Payback, and both traded barbs on the following Raw. On the final Raw before Payback, Rollins, Enzo Amore, and Big Cass were scheduled to face Joe, Luke Gallows, and Karl Anderson, but Gallows and Anderson attacked Amore, taking him out of the match. Amore was replaced by Finn Bálor, and the team of Rollins, Cass, and Bálor defeated Joe, Gallows, and Anderson. Gallows and Anderson were then scheduled to face Amore and Cass on the Payback Kickoff pre-show.

At the Royal Rumble, Braun Strowman interfered in the Universal Championship match, costing Roman Reigns the title. The two then faced each other at Fastlane, where Reigns was victorious. The following night on Raw, Strowman declared that Reigns had gotten lucky and wanted another rematch, however, he was interrupted by The Undertaker. Reigns began a rivalry with Undertaker and defeated at Wrestlemania 33. Strowman then reignited his feud with Reigns on the April 10 episode of Raw, where he brutally attacked Reigns backstage, including pushing Reigns, who was strapped onto a stretcher, off a loading dock, and then tipped over an ambulance that Reigns was inside, thereby injuring Reigns's shoulder in the process. The following week, Raw General Manager Kurt Angle announced that Strowman would face Reigns at Payback. Angle also gave Strowman the night off. Despite this, Strowman began wreaking havoc backstage until Big Show stopped him, resulting in a match between the two on Raw. The match ended after Strowman performed a superplex on Show from the top rop, after which, the ring imploded. The following week, Kalisto (one of the wrestlers that Strowman attacked backstage the previous week) defeated Strowman in a dumpster match. Afterwards, Strowman attacked Kalisto, locked him in the dumpster, and rolled it off the stage.

At WrestleMania 33, Bayley retained the Raw Women's Championship against Charlotte Flair, Sasha Banks, and Nia Jax in a fatal four-way elimination match. On the April 10 episode of Raw, Banks declared her desire to challenge Bayley for the title. Alexa Bliss, who had lost the SmackDown Women's Championship at WrestleMania 33, then appeared, followed by Mickie James, and both revealed that they had been moved to Raw as a result of the Superstar Shake-up; Flair was transferred to SmackDown. The next week, Bliss defeated Banks, James, and Jax in a fatal four-way match to become the number one contender against Bayley for the Raw Women's Championship at Payback. The following week, after a verbal confrontation between Bayley and Bliss, Bliss faced Banks where Bliss was intentionally counted out. Following the match, Bayley tried to get Bliss back to the ring, but Bliss escaped backstage. Bliss then returned, however, and attacked Bayley.

On the April 10 episode of Raw, The Miz and his wife Maryse were moved to the Raw brand as a result of the Superstar Shake-up. On the April 24 episode, it was announced that Finn Bálor would be The Miz's guest on Miz TV, which was scheduled for the Payback Kickoff pre-show.

Event

Pre-show 
During the Payback Kickoff pre-show, Enzo Amore and Big Cass faced Luke Gallows and Karl Anderson. Amore pinned Gallows with a schoolboy for the win.

Later, The Miz hosted ‘’Miz TV’’ with Finn Bálor as the guest. Bálor stated that he wanted the Universal Championship back, as he never lost it, and ended up attacking Miz.

Preliminary matches 
The actual pay-per-view opened with the first interbrand match, in which SmackDown's Kevin Owens defended the United States Championship against Raw's Chris Jericho. Owens attempted a Pop-up Powerbomb on Jericho, who countered into a hurricanrana. Jericho applied the "Walls of Jericho" but Owens touched the ropes with only one finger to break the hold. After Owens failed to execute a Pop Up Powerbomb, Jericho forced Owens to submit to the "Walls of Jericho" to regain the title for a second time. As a result of the win, Jericho was transferred to the SmackDown brand.

Next, Neville defended the NXT Cruiserweight Championship against Austin Aries. In the climax, as Aries applied the "Last Chancery", Neville pulled the referee by his shirt. The referee then disqualified Neville, resulting in Aries winning the match but not the title.

Later, The Hardy Boyz (Jeff and Matt Hardy) defended the Raw Tag Team Championship against The Bar (Cesaro and Sheamus). The end came when Jeff performed a "Swanton Bomb" on Sheamus, who was covering Matt and unaware that Jeff was the legal man. Jeff then pinned Sheamus to retain the title. After the match, the two teams shook hands. However, as Jeff and Matt were celebrating, Cesaro and Sheamus returned and attacked The Hardys, thereby turning heel.

In the fourth match, Bayley defend the Raw Women's Championship against Alexa Bliss. The match ended after Bliss performed a Snap DDT on Bayley to win the title for the first time. As a result of her win, Bliss became the first wrestler to win both the Raw and SmackDown women's championships.

Next was the second interbrand match, in which SmackDown's WWE Champion Randy Orton faced Raw's Bray Wyatt in a non-title House of Horrors match. The match was a No Holds Barred match type that began in the House of Horrors, but could only be won by pinning or submitting their opponent in the ring or by forfeit. A cinematic match, it began when Orton broke into the house and Wyatt attacked Orton. Orton and Wyatt fought throughout the house and into the kitchen, where Wyatt pushed a refrigerator onto Orton. Wyatt then stole Orton's limousine and drove to the arena.

In the meantime back in the arena, Seth Rollins faced Samoa Joe. Joe applied the "Coquina Clutch" on Rollins, who countered into a pin for the win, ending Joe's undefeated streak since debuting on the main roster in January 2017.

Later, RAW's Bray Wyatt arrived at the arena and performed his usual entrance. As the lights came on, SmackDown's Randy Orton appeared and attacked Wyatt. SmackDown's The Singh Brothers (Samir and Sunil) then appeared and attacked Orton, who managed to fight them off. Orton performed an "RKO" on Wyatt, only for Jinder Mahal to attack Orton with the title belt he had stolen from Orton on the previous episode of SmackDown. Wyatt then performed "Sister Abigail" on Orton to win the match.

Main event 
In the main event, Roman Reigns faced Braun Strowman. Strowman performed a chokeslam on Reigns onto a broadcast table. Reigns performed a spear on Strowman for a near-fall. Reigns performed two "Superman Punches" on Strowman and attempted a third, however, Strowman applied a lifting arm triangle choke and performed a running powerslam on Reigns for a near-fall. In the climax, Strowman performed a second Running Powerslam on Reigns to win the match. After the match, Strowman attacked Reigns with the steel steps and stood tall as the event ended.

Aftermath 
Immediately following Payback on Raw Talk, Roman Reigns was about to be taken to a medical facility, but Braun Strowman attempted to further damage him. Reigns retaliated by slamming an ambulance door against Strowman's arm multiple times. The next night on Raw, General Manager Kurt Angle addressed the two's condition and said that both were injured. The following week, Strowman, in an arm sling, said that after he was completely finished with Reigns, he wanted Brock Lesnar and the Universal Championship, but Kalisto came out and demanded a rematch. That match ended after Reigns came out and attacked Strowman. The following week, it was revealed that Strowman required surgery on his injured arm, and would be out for up to six months. Reigns, along with Seth Rollins, Samoa Joe, Bray Wyatt, and Finn Bálor were scheduled to compete in a Universal Championship number one contender's extreme rules fatal five-way match at Extreme Rules.

Also on the post-Payback Raw, Seth Rollins said that his business with Samoa Joe was done. He then turned his attention to Universal Champion Brock Lesnar, however, Finn Bálor interrupted and stated that he should be the next person to face Lesnar as Bálor was the inaugural champion and never lost the title. Intercontinental Champion Dean Ambrose then came out. He criticized Lesnar for not appearing and wrestling often and claimed the Intercontinental Championship to be the top title of Raw. The Miz then came out and said that he should be the one to face Ambrose for the title. A number one contender's match was scheduled between Rollins, Bálor, and Miz, which Miz won after interference from Joe and Bray Wyatt. The Miz and Ambrose had their title match on the May 15 episode where Miz won by disqualification. A rematch between the two was scheduled for Extreme Rules where if Ambrose were disqualified, he would lose the title.

Jeff Hardy received medical attention after losing a tooth from a kick by Sheamus midway through their Payback match. On the post-Payback Raw, Cesaro and Sheamus explained their reasoning for attacking The Hardy Boyz. They called The Hardys a novelty act and criticized the fans for living in the past instead of appreciating the present and claimed that The Hardys stole their moment at WrestleMania 33. Cesaro and Sheamus subsequently won a number one contender's tag team turmoil match for another title opportunity at Extreme Rules, which was made a steel cage match. Also in the tag team division, Enzo Amore and Big Cass continued their feud with Luke Gallows and Karl Anderson.

Also on the post-Payback Raw, new Raw Women's Champion Alexa Bliss had a coronation on becoming the new champion as well as being the first woman to win both the Raw and SmackDown women's titles. The other seven female wrestlers on the Raw roster were also in the ring. She belittled Mickie James, Sasha Banks, and Bayley before a brawl broke out that resulted in an eight-woman tag team match where the team of Bliss, Nia Jax, Emma, and Alicia Fox defeated the team of Bayley, Banks, James, and Dana Brooke. On the May 15 episode, Bayley invoked her championship rematch clause for Extreme Rules, and it was made a Kendo Stick-on-a-Pole match.

WWE Cruiserweight Champion Neville and T. J. Perkins continued their feud with Austin Aries. Perkins was defeated by Aries on the post-Payback Raw, but Perkins attacked Aries after the match and attempted to injure him. Aries was given another championship opportunity at Extreme Rules in a submission match.

On the May 2 episode of SmackDown, Kevin Owens defeated Chris Jericho in a rematch for the United States Championship. Owens subsequently injured Jericho, taking him out of action. Owens was then scheduled to defend the title against AJ Styles at SmackDown's pay-per-view Backlash.

The 2017 Payback would be the final Payback event until it was reinstated in 2020, as following WrestleMania 34 in 2018, WWE discontinued brand-exclusive PPVs, which resulted in the reduction of yearly PPVs produced. This subsequently made the 2017 event the only brand-exclusive Payback event.

Results

References

External links 

2017
2017 in California
2017 WWE Network events
Professional wrestling in San Jose, California
Events in California
2017 WWE pay-per-view events
April 2017 events in the United States
WWE Raw